Howerton is an English toponymic surname, which indicates someone from Horton in Northampton. Notable people with the surname include:

Bill Howerton (1921–2001), American baseball player
Charles Howerton, American television and film actor
Glenn Howerton (born 1976), American television and film actor
Kent Howerton (born 1954), American motocross racer